Pavlica may refer to:

 Pavlica, Slovenia, a village in Slovenia
 Pavlica (Raška), a village in Serbia
 16274 Pavlica, an asteroid